Tephritis valida is a species of tephritid or fruit flies in the genus Tephritis of the family Tephritidae.

Distribution
Hungary to Turkey & Caucasus.

References

Tephritinae
Insects described in 1858
Diptera of Europe
Diptera of Asia